#FreeRayshawn (stylized as #freerayshawn) is an American series written by Marc Maurino and directed by Seith Mann that debuted on Quibi on April 6, 2020.

Premise 
Rayshawn Morris, an African-American Iraqi War veteran, finds himself holed up in his apartment along with his family after an altercation with overzealous NOPD cops. As he prepares to make his last stand, Rayshawn turns to social media and the help of a sympathetic police lieutenant for him to try to clear his name.

Cast 
 Laurence Fishburne as Lt. Steven Poincy
 Stephan James as Rayshawn Morris
 Jasmine Cephas Jones as Tyisha
 Skeet Ulrich as Sgt. Mike Trout
 Danny Boyd Jr. as Ray Jr.
 Thomas Blake Jr. as Detective Soules
 Mitch Eakins as Detective Tommy Roberts
 Alyshia Ochse as DA Sarah Foreman
 Daniel Sunjata as SWAT Commander Alvarez

Episodes

Accolades

References

External links 
 
 

Quibi original programming
2020s American drama television series
2020 American television series debuts
English-language television shows
American drama web series
Television shows set in New Orleans
Television series about social media